Elections to Strabane District Council were held on 5 May 2011 on the same day as the other Northern Irish local government elections. The election used three district electoral areas to elect a total of 16 councillors.

Election results

Note: "Votes" are the first preference votes.

Districts summary

|- class="unsortable" align="centre"
!rowspan=2 align="left"|Ward
! % 
!Cllrs
! % 
!Cllrs
! %
!Cllrs
! %
!Cllrs
! % 
!Cllrs
!rowspan=2|TotalCllrs
|- class="unsortable" align="center"
!colspan=2 bgcolor="" | Sinn Féin
!colspan=2 bgcolor="" | DUP
!colspan=2 bgcolor="" | UUP
!colspan=2 bgcolor="" | SDLP
!colspan=2 bgcolor="white"| Others
|-
|align="left"|Derg
|bgcolor="#008800"|40.2
|bgcolor="#008800"|3
|24.6
|1
|22.7
|1
|4.6
|0
|7.9
|0
|5
|-
|align="left"|Glenelly
|31.7
|2
|bgcolor="#D46A4C"|47.9
|bgcolor="#D46A4C"|3
|10.5
|0
|10.0
|0
|0.0
|0
|5
|-
|align="left"|Mourne
|bgcolor="#008800"|45.1
|bgcolor="#008800"|3
|0.0
|0
|7.9
|0
|12.6
|1
|34.4
|2
|6
|-
|- class="unsortable" class="sortbottom" style="background:#C9C9C9"
|align="left"| Total
|39.3
|8
|23.2
|4
|13.6
|1
|9.2
|1
|14.7
|2
|16
|-
|}

District results

Derg

2005: 3 x Sinn Féin, 1 x DUP, 1 x UUP
2011: 3 x Sinn Féin, 1 x DUP, 1 x UUP
2005-2011 Change: No change

Glenelly

2005: 2 x DUP, 1 x Sinn Féin, 1 x UUP, 1 x SDLP
2011: 3 x DUP, 2 x Sinn Féin
2005-2011 Change: DUP and Sinn Féin gain from UUP and SDLP

Mourne

2005: 4 x Sinn Féin, 1 x SDLP, 1 x Independent
2011: 3 x Sinn Féin, 2 x Independent, 1 x SDLP
2005-2011 Change: Independent gain from Sinn Féin

References

Strabane District Council elections
Strabane